The English River Formation is a geologic formation in Illinois. It preserves fossils dating back to the Carboniferous period.

See also

 List of fossiliferous stratigraphic units in Illinois

References
 

Carboniferous Iowa
Carboniferous Illinois
Devonian southern paleotemperate deposits
Carboniferous southern paleotropical deposits